Michael Noone (born 16 October 1989) is an Irish rugby union player from County Wicklow, Ireland currently playing for Clontarf 

Noone is from Greystones, County Wicklow. He was educated at Presentation College, Bray where he played in the final of the Leinster Schools Junior Cup alongside fellow future professional, Jason Harris-Wright. Noone then moved to C.B.C. Monkstown where they reached the semi finals of the Senior Cup. Noone has captained Leinster at all under age levels. He also led a strong contingent of CBC players on an undefeated tour to South Africa before being selected to the Irish under 19 squad.

Following school Noone immediately began playing 1st XV club rugby at Seapoint, where he first played the game. In 2010 he moved to Blackrock College. Noone also represented the Ireland national under-20 rugby union team in the 2009/2010 season.

In 2011 Michael Noone played for Doncaster Knights in the RFU Championship. He signed for Leicester in September 2012. In 2014 Noone signed for Jersey. He has now played for Clontarf for 3 years. Winning the All Ireland title in his first year. Noone, now in his third year is currently the capitan. Michael Noone is in a small selection of players to capitan under the age of 30.

References

External links
http://www.bbc.co.uk/sport/0/rugby-union/19638510
http://www.thisisleicestershire.co.uk/haven-t-looked-joining-Leicester-Tigers-says/story-17264667-detail/story.html
http://www.thisisleicestershire.co.uk/Leicester-Tigers-close-sealing-deal-rower-Michael/story-16935059-detail/story.html
http://www.leicestertigers.com/rugby/leicester_tigers_senior_squad.php?player=81945

1989 births
Living people
Irish rugby union players
Irish expatriate rugby union players
Expatriate rugby union players in England
Leicester Tigers players
Alumni of the National College of Ireland
People educated at C.B.C. Monkstown
Rugby union players from County Wicklow
Rugby union number eights
People from Greystones
Expatriate rugby union players in Jersey
Irish expatriate sportspeople in Jersey
Irish expatriate sportspeople in England